Moon shell or Moonshell may refer to:

 Euspira heros, the northern moon snail
 Neverita didyma, the bladder moon snail
 Naticidae or moon snails, a family of minute to large-sized predatory sea snails
 Moonshell (horse), a racehorse

Animal common name disambiguation pages